İbrahim Kelle (1897 – 2 February 1965) was a Turkish footballer. He played in one match for the Turkey national football team in 1923. He was also part of Turkey's squad for the football tournament at the 1924 Summer Olympics, but he did not play in any matches.

References

External links
 

1897 births
1965 deaths
Turkish footballers
Turkey international footballers
Place of birth missing
Association football midfielders
Altınordu F.K. players
Olympic footballers of Turkey
Footballers at the 1924 Summer Olympics